Single may refer to:

Arts, entertainment, and media
 Single (music), a song release

Songs
 "Single" (Natasha Bedingfield song), 2004
 "Single" (New Kids on the Block and Ne-Yo song), 2008
 "Single" (William Wei song), 2016
 "Single", by Meghan Trainor from the album Only 17

Sports
 Single (baseball), the most common type of base hit
 Single (cricket), point in cricket
 Single (football), Canadian football point
 Single-speed bicycle

Transportation
 Single-cylinder engine, an internal combustion engine design with one cylinder, or a motorcycle using such engine
 Single (locomotive), a steam locomotive with a single pair of driving wheels
 As a verb: to convert a double-track railway to a single-track railway

Other uses
 Single (mathematics) (1-tuple), a list or sequence with only one element
 Single person, a person who is not in a committed relationship
 Single precision, a computer numbering format that occupies one storage location in computer memory at a given address
 "Single", a slang term for a United States one-dollar bill
 A type of bet offered by UK bookmakers

See also
 Alone (disambiguation)
 Singel (disambiguation)
 Single-ended (disambiguation)
 Singles (disambiguation)

es:Solo
he:סינגל
sv:Singel
th:ซิงเกิ้ล